{{DISPLAYTITLE:Eta2 Doradus}}

Eta2 Doradus, Latinized from η2 Doradus, is a star in the southern constellation of Dorado. It is visible to the naked eye as a dim, reddish star with an apparent visual magnitude of 5.01 It is about 580 light years from the Sun as shown by parallax, and its net movement is one of receding, having a radial velocity of +34.5 km/s. It is circumpolar south of latitude  S.

This object is an M-type giant star, with its stellar classification being M2.5III. The star is radiating about 1200 times the Sun's luminosity from its photosphere, at an effective temperature of 3726 K.

References

External links
 2004. Starry Night Pro, Version 5.8.4. Imaginova. . www.starrynight.com

M-type giants
043455

029353
PD-65 00561

Dorado (constellation)
Doradus, Eta2
2245